Jami Deadly (born May 18, 1979 as Jami Edwards) is an American actress, glamour model, singer, burlesque dancer and horror host. Jami grew up in Texas. She lives in Las Vegas, Nevada.

Biography
Jami Edwards was a nightclub dancer. Along with students from the University of North Texas, she launched and hosted the horror host show Deadly Cinema which ran from 2003 to 2005 (2 seasons) on the Denton channel NTTV. The staff was amateur and working for school credits. The show is currently broadcast on Roku.

After Deadly Cinema, Jami Deadly became a burlesque performer. She made an appearance in the 2007 movie Devil Girl alongside Dita Von Teese. Jami is also a Marilyn Monroe tribute artist, and performed as such during the 2006 Texas State Fair. Jami's transformation into Marilyn is supported by a coach to help her coax her Texas twang into Marilyn's breathiness. She has taken singing and dancing lessons to perfect Marilyn's routines, and her blond hair requires weekly peroxide applications.

Jamie Deadly has modeled for Poison Candy and Versatile Fashions. She was a SuicideGirls model.

Since the mid-2000s, she only made rare appearances in public events.

Filmography

Prizes
2005: Scream Queen of the month by Screamqueen.com

References

External links

1979 births
Female models from Texas
Horror hosts
Living people
American neo-burlesque performers
People from McKinney, Texas
People from the Las Vegas Valley
21st-century American women